The Restless Gun is an American Western television series that appeared on NBC between 1957 and 1959, with John Payne in the role of Vint Bonner, a wandering cowboy in the era after the American Civil War. A skilled gunfighter, Bonner is an idealistic person who prefers peaceful resolutions of conflict wherever possible. He is gregarious, intelligent, and public-spirited. The half-hour black-and-white program aired 78 episodes (including the Pilot episode in which the John Payne character's name is Britt Ponsett, the name of James Stewart's character in the 1953-54 old time radio series The Six Shooter, upon which The Restless Gun television series was originally based).

The Restless Gun theme song (officially titled "I Ride With the Wind") begins: "I ride with the wind, my eyes on the sun, and my hand on my restless gun..."  The song composer is probably Paul Dunlap, credited as the primary series composer, but could have been contributed to by either of the two other series composers, Dave Kahn and Stanley Wilson.  Two versions (one a vocal) are currently posted on YouTube, but neither posting lists any composer or performance credits.

Episodes

Season 1: 1957–58

Season 2: 1958–59

Selected guest stars

Home media
On March 1, 2010, Timeless Media Group released a three-disc best-of set featuring 24 episodes from the series.

On April 23, 2013, Timeless Media released Restless Gun: The Complete Series on DVD in Region 1.  The 9-disc set features all 78 episodes of the series.

References

External links
 

1957 American television series debuts
1959 American television series endings
Black-and-white American television shows
English-language television shows
NBC original programming
Television series by Universal Television
1950s Western (genre) television series